The art of flag throwing dates back to medieval guilds (principally in Italy, Germany, Switzerland, Flanders and Southern Netherlands). A guild's banner or flag was considered a symbol of purity, and as such it was not allowed to touch the ground.

There are two major categories of flag throwing: classical and acrobatical.  In classical flag throwing, the flag is turned left and right around the body in a standing posture.  In acrobatical flag throwing, the thrower uses both hands to move the flag in a sitting, laying, or kneeling posture.

External links

 Federazione italiana Sbandieratori The Italian official flag throwing federation.
 Lega italiana Sbandieratori The Italian flag throwing league.
 Flag throwing, on Flags Of The World website.
 SbandierAutori - An italian book on the flag throwers tradition
 Alfieri's "La Bandiera" - Information on Francesco Alfieri's treatise on flag waving, 'La Bandiera', published in 1638

Entertainment occupations
Flag practices
Guilds
Medieval occupations
Object manipulation
Swiss culture